Macarthur Islands are small islands in Shelburne Bay in far north Queensland, Australia a few hundred met1.738. It is around 48 hectares or 0.48 square km in size.

References

Islands on the Great Barrier Reef
Uninhabited islands of Australia
Islands of Far North Queensland